This is a list of flags that are used exclusively in Scotland. Other flags used in Scotland, as well as the rest of the United Kingdom can be found at list of British flags.

National flag
 A white saltire on a Pantone 300 medium blue per Scottish National Flag Code.

Royal flags

Government flags

Counties, regions, and cities

Counties

Islands

Local authorities

Historical flags

University flags

Organisations

Notes

References

External links

 
Scotland